Pemphis acidula, commonly known as bantigue (pron. ) or mentigi, is a species of flowering plant in the family Lythraceae. It is a mangrove found throughout most of the tropical Indo-Pacific growing on rocky shores. The genus Pemphis, to which it belongs, was until recently thought to have only this single species, first described in 1775 and long considered the type species, but is now believed to have at least one other.

Distribution and habitat
Pemphis acidula is a halophyte bush found in coastal locations in the tropical areas of the Indo-Pacific. It is one of the types of shrubs growing in sandy and calcareous soils of the littoral zones of the Indian Ocean and the western and central Pacific Ocean. It is also found in mangroves.

Uses
The wood of this species has been traditionally valued in many cultures for it is hard and heavy, as well as resistant to rot and warping. It also has naturally a fine finish and may be fashioned into walking canes, fence posts, tool handles, and even anchors. In Réunion and Mauritius it is known as bois matelot. In the Maldives this hardy wood was used in traditional shipbuilding to hold the planks of the hull together, as well as to fashion "nails" in local sorcery.

Pemphis acidula is also one of the plant species used in bonsai. Due to its tropical preference and typhoon-resistance, it is the most common species for bonsai in the Philippines; but it is also grown as bonsai in Taiwan and the Ryukyu Islands of Japan. Due to its popularity and high value among bonsai enthusiasts, it is among the list of species classified as 'threatened' by the Department of Environment and Natural Resources of the Philippines. The collection, selling, and transport of wild Pemphis acidula is illegal in the Philippines and punishable by fines and imprisonment of up to six years.

In Marovo Island, Tonga, Tahiti, and other South Pacific islands, it is used to make wooden tools such as pestles, tool handles, weapons, and combs.

In Taiwan's Kenting National Park illegal picking has had a negative impact on the coastal ecosystem.

Leaves, flowers and fruits

See also 
Mangroves

References

External links

Lythraceae
Flora of Seychelles
Flora of the Philippines
Flora of the Maldives
Flora of Tonga
Plants used in bonsai
Flora of the Northern Mariana Islands
Flora of Oceania
Flora of Micronesia